Wartman is a surname. Notable people with the surname include:

Mark Wartman (born 1951), Canadian politician
Ray Wartman (1915–2008), Australian football player